WSTV (104.9 FM) is an adult hits formatted broadcast radio station licensed to Roanoke, Virginia, serving Metro Roanoke and the New River Valley. WSTV is owned and operated by iHeartMedia.

WSTV broadcasts an alternative rock format on 104.9 HD2.

On May 1, 2019, the station changed their call letters to WSTV in anticipation of the adult hits-formatted "Steve FM" moving from WSFF 106.1 FM Vinton/WSNZ 101.7 FM Lynchburg which were in the process of being sold to Educational Media Foundation. Concurrently, the WJJS calls were moved to sister station WSNV in anticipation of the CHR format moving to the 93.5 frequency. The frequency move was completed on May 30, 2019.

References

External links
Steve FM Online

Smooth Jazz Network

1998 establishments in Virginia
Radio stations established in 1998
STV (FM)
IHeartMedia radio stations
Adult hits radio stations in the United States